Eestilepididae is a family of extinct fish, with unknown classification. The family consists of one genus (Eestilepis) with one species (Eestilepis prominens).

References

Thelodonti